Ministry of Economic Cooperation with Foreign Countries was a Polish government administration office, its tasks included implementation of state policy and coordination of activities in the field of economic, trade and scientific and technical relations with foreign countries.

The Ministry was established by the Act on the Establishment of the Office of the Minister of Foreign Economic Cooperation of 23 October 1987. The tasks and competences of the liquidated ministry were incorporated into the Ministry of Economy and the Ministry of State Treasury.

List of ministers

External links
 Official government website of Poland

References

1990
1990
Poland,1987
1987 establishments in Poland